On April 4–5, 1966, an outbreak of at least three tornadoes affected portions of Florida and North Carolina. It included a deadly pair of tornado families that struck the I-4 corridor in Central Florida from the Tampa Bay Area to Brevard County. The two tornadoes are officially listed as continuous events, but the tornadoes' damage paths did not cross the entire state, and downbursts may have been responsible for destruction near Lake Juliana and in the Kissimmee–Saint Cloud area. However, tornado and downburst damage combined was continuous from coast to coast.

One of the tornadoes produced estimated F4 damage on the Fujita scale; it remains one of only two F4 tornadoes to strike the U.S. state of Florida, the other of which occurred on April 15, 1958. Both F4 tornadoes coincided with El Niño—a condition known to locally enhance severe weather over Florida. On April 4, 1966, a total of 11 people were killed across the state of Florida, including three in the city of Tampa and seven in Polk County. The F4 tornado remains the fourth-deadliest tornado event recorded in Florida; only tornadoes on March 31, 1962, February 2, 2007, and February 23, 1998, caused more deaths in the state. All of the events were induced by non-tropical cyclones.

Background
A squall line affected the central Florida peninsula on April 4, and both tornadoes originated as waterspouts over the Gulf of Mexico. Initially, the tornadoes were poorly forecasted by the U.S. Weather Bureau, since meteorological analysis did not indicate the presence of an adjacent surface low, which would have enhance conditions for tornadoes. The first tornado watch was not released prior to the tornadoes.

Confirmed tornadoes

April 4 event

April 5 event

Largo–Clearwater–Carrollwood–Temple Terrace–Galloway–Gibsonia–Loughman, Florida

The first and most damaging of at least two long-tracked tornado families touched down around 8:00 a.m. EST near Largo, Florida, in Pinellas County. It damaged 36–40 houses in the Clearwater area. Later, it continued across the northern side of Tampa, where it demolished 150–158 homes and caused significant damages to 186 residences, primarily in and near Carrollwood and Temple Terrace. Three fatalities occurred in this area, all on a single block. The tornado also caused damage to a junior high school (now called Greco Middle School), and ripped roofs off homes and one dormitory on the University of South Florida's main campus. Losses in the Tampa Bay Area reached $4 million.

The tornado moved east-northeast into Polk County and progressed through Galloway and Gibsonia, devastating those rural communities, both of which received the most severe damages in Polk County; at least 93 and possibly more than 100 homes were demolished in the area, one or two of which sustained F4 damage, and seven deaths occurred. Reports indicated the possibility of a pair of tornadoes in the Galloway–Gibsonia area, each on a parallel track. This and the next tornado collectively destroyed 480 homes, killed eight people, injured 280 others, and caused $20 million in damages in Polk County alone.

After striking Galloway and Gibsonia, the tornado also destroyed many trailers and a restaurant in the Loughman area, north of Haines City and Davenport. One woman died in a mobile home,  outside Davenport. The tornado eventually moved over the Cocoa area and lifted between Courtenay and Merritt Island. Total damages reached $75 million, 11 people were killed, and 530 people received injuries. The total path length may have been less——than is officially listed.

St. Petersburg–Lakeland–Winter Haven–Haines City–Auburndale–Holopaw–Rockledge–Cocoa–Cocoa Beach, Florida

The second of a pair of tornado families touched down 15 minutes later than its predecessor near the Sunshine Skyway Bridge, where it lifted a  trailer and an automobile. In the Pinellas Point area, on the southernmost edge of St. Petersburg, the tornado damaged or destroyed 43 homes and injured nine people. It then crossed Tampa Bay, moved inland over Central Florida, and closely paralleled the path of the more powerful first tornado. A total of 15 homes were destroyed in Lakeland, while homes and businesses were demolished in northern Winter Haven. 18 students at a school in Lakeland sustained injuries. The tornado also destroyed warehouses, Citrus trees, and trailers from Auburndale and northern Winter Haven to just south of Haines City.

The tornado later crossed into Osceola County, passing near Holopaw, and continued into Brevard County. In the Cocoa Beach–Rockledge area, 150 trailers in six different trailer parks were destroyed, resulting in more than 100 injuries. A shopping center and 20–23 frame homes were likewise demolished. Additionally, the tornado struck the training site for the Houston Astros in nearby Cocoa, ripping four light standards from the ground, flattening the center field fence, and destroying all the backstops and batting cages. One of the cages was thrown more than  into nearby woods.

Tornado researcher Thomas P. Grazulis classified the tornado as an F3 and split the event into two separate tornadoes, at least one of which was likely a tornado family.

Aftermath and recovery
Widespread looting was reported in some localized areas after the passage of the tornadoes in Hillsborough and Polk counties; a total of 200 National Guardsmen were deployed to the two counties, while lesser numbers were ordered to the city of Cocoa. Damage in the Lakeland area was compared to the aftermath of the Normandy invasion during World War II. This event may have contained multiple tornadoes, which would constitute another tornado family.

See also
List of North American tornadoes and tornado outbreaks

Notes

References

Sources

 

 

F4 tornadoes by date
Tampa, 1966-04-04
T
Tornadoes in Florida
Tampa Tornado Family, 1966|T
April 1966 events in the United States
1966 natural disasters in the United States